Dithrycini is a tribe of tephritid  or fruit flies in the family Tephritidae.

Genera
Aciurina Curran, 1932
Dithryca Rondani, 1856
Eurosta Loew, 1873
Hendrella Munro, 1938
Liepana Hardy & Drew, 1996
Oedaspis Loew, 1862
Oedoncus Speiser, 1924
Peronyma Loew, 1873
Placaciura Hendel, 1927
Ptiloedaspis Bezzi, 1920
Valentibulla Foote & Blanc, 1959
Xenodorella Munro, 1967

References

Tephritinae
Diptera tribes